This is a list of aircraft manufacturers sorted alphabetically by International Civil Aviation Organization (ICAO)/common name. It contains the ICAO/common name, manufacturers name(s), country and other data, with the known years of operation in parentheses. The ICAO names are listed in bold. Having an ICAO name does not mean that a manufacturer is still in operation today, just that some of the aircraft produced by that manufacturer are still flying.

List of aircraft manufacturers (A)
List of aircraft manufacturers (B–C)
List of aircraft manufacturers (D–G)
List of aircraft manufacturers (H–L)
List of aircraft manufacturers (M–P)
List of aircraft manufacturers (Q–S)
List of aircraft manufacturers (T–Z)

See also
 List of aircraft
 List of aircraft by date and usage category 
 List of aircraft manufacturers by ICAO name
 List of civil aircraft
 List of jet aircraft of World War II
 List of rotorcraft manufacturers by country
 Lists of military aircraft by nation

External links 
 List of all Manufacturers – Aviation Fanatic

 

 Aircraft manufacturers, list of